Splicing factor 3 subunit 1 is a protein that in humans is encoded by the SF3A1 gene.

This gene encodes subunit 1 of the splicing factor 3a protein complex. The splicing factor 3a heterotrimer includes subunits 1, 2 and 3 and is necessary for the in vitro conversion of 15S U2 snRNP into an active 17S particle that performs pre-mRNA splicing. Subunit 1 belongs to the SURP protein family; named for the SURP (also called SWAP or Suppressor-of-White-APricot) motifs that are thought to mediate RNA binding. Subunit 1 has tandemly repeated SURP motifs in its amino-terminal half while its carboxy-terminal half contains a proline-rich region and a ubiquitin-like domain. Binding studies with truncated subunit 1 derivatives demonstrated that the two SURP motifs are necessary for binding to subunit 3 while contacts with subunit 2 may occur through sequences carboxy-terminal to the SURP motifs. Alternative splicing results in multiple transcript variants encoding different isoforms.

Interactions
SF3A1 has been shown to interact with SF3A3 and CDC5L.

References

Further reading

External links